The Sandakan District is an administrative district in the Malaysian state of Sabah, part of the Sandakan Division which includes the districts of Beluran, Kinabatangan, Sandakan, Telupid and Tongod. The capital of the district is in Sandakan City.

There are three members of parliament (MPs) representing the three parliamentary constituencies in the district: Libaran (P.184), Batu Sapi (P.185), and Sandakan (P.186).

Demographics 

Sandakan district is the third largest of Sabah's 25 districts, with 396,290 inhabitants after Kota Kinabalu and Tawau.

Gallery

See also 
 Districts of Malaysia

References

Further reading

External links 

  Sandakan Municipal Council